Women's Combined World Cup 1990/1991

Calendar

Final point standings

In Women's Combined World Cup 1990/91 both results count.

Note:

In race 2 not all points were awarded (not enough finishers).

Women's Combined Team Results

bold indicate highest score - italics indicate race wins

References

External links
 

World Cup
FIS Alpine Ski World Cup women's combined discipline titles